Bufonaria is a genus of medium-large sea snails, marine gastropod molluscs in the family Bursidae, the "frog snails".

Species
Species within the genus Bufonaria include: 
 Bufonaria cavitensis (Reeve, 1844)
 Bufonaria cristinae Parth, 1989
 Bufonaria crumena (Lamarck, 1816)
 Bufonaria echinata (Link, 1807)
 Bufonaria elegans (G.B. Sowerby II, 1836)
 Bufonaria foliata (Broderip, 1826)
 Bufonaria granosa (Martin, 1884)
 Bufonaria margaritula (Deshayes, 1832)
 Bufonaria perelegans Beu, 1987
 Bufonaria rana (Linnaeus, 1758)
 Bufonaria thersites (Redfield, 1846)
Species brought into synonymy  
 Bufonaria albivaricosa (Reeve, 1844): synonym of Bufonaria rana (Linnaeus, 1758)
 Bufonaria borisbeckeri Parth, 1966: synonym of Bursina borisbeckeri (Parth, 1996)
 Bufonaria bufo (Bruguière, 1792): synonym of Marsupina bufo (Bruguière, 1792)
 Bufonaria (Aspa) crumenoides Valenciennes, A., 1832: synonym of Bufonaria (Aspa) crumena crumena (Lamarck, J.B.P.A. de, 1816)
 Bufonaria fernandesi Beu, 1977: synonym of Bursina fernandezi (Beu, 1977)
 Bufonaria gnorima (Melvill, 1918): synonym of Bursina gnorima (Melvilll, 1918)
 Bufonaria ignobilis Beu, 1987: synonym of Bursina ignobilis (Beu, 1987)
 Bufonaria lamarckii (Deshayes, 1853): synonym of Bursa lamarckii (Deshayes, 1853)
 Bufonaria marginata (Gmelin, 1791): synonym of Aspa marginata (Gmelin, 1791)
 Bufonaria nobilis (Reeve, L.A., 1844): synonym of Bursina nobilis (Reeve, 1844)
 Bufonaria pesleonis Schumacher, 1817: synonym of Bursa scrobilator (Linnaeus, 1758)
 Bufonaria spinosa Schumacher, 1817: synonym of Bufonaria echinata (Link, 1807)
 Bufonaria subgranosa: synonym of Bufonaria rana (Linnaeus, 1758)

References

 Atlas of Living Australia info at: 
 Rolán E., 2005. Malacological Fauna From The Cape Verde Archipelago. Part 1, Polyplacophora and Gastropoda.''

Bursidae
Gastropod genera